Gardner–Edgerton USD 231 is a public unified school district headquartered in Gardner, Kansas, United States.  The district includes the communities of Gardner, Edgerton, and nearby rural areas.

History
Being located in the rapidly growing southern portion of Johnson County, USD 231 has had to manage the challenges of exploding enrollment numbers since the late 1990s. The district built the current high school in 2000. The building has been expanded several times since opening. Every school in the district has been built or renovated since 2000. A new bond issue was passed in January 2012 which financed the construction of new campus for a third middle school and new elementary school, upgrades to the District Activity Center, and construction of a new Multi-purpose Athletic Center on the high school campus. A $29.7 million bond issue was passed in 2016 to construct an Advanced Technical Center, addition to the high school to address enrollment growth, a TRAILS facility for adults with disabilities, and capital improvements.

Gardner-Edgerton is a fast-growing district of approximately 6,000 students in Johnson County. Approximately 175 new students arrive in Gardner each year. Gardner is one of the top 10 school districts in the state of Kansas—Niche Marketing.

Administration

Superintendent
The Gardner-Edgerton Unified School District is currently under the leadership of Superintendent, Brian Huff.

Board of Education
The Gardner-Edgerton Board of Education is currently under the leadership of President Tom Reddin, and Vice President Lana Sutton.

Schools
As of 2011, the district comprises 1 high school, 3 middle schools, and 7 elementary schools.  All but one school in the district, an elementary school, are located in Gardner, Kansas while the elementary school is located in Edgerton, Kansas.

High school
 Gardner Edgerton High School - Mascot: Trailblazers

Middle schools
 Pioneer Ridge Middle School - Mascot: Jaguars
 Wheatridge Middle School - Mascot: Mustangs
 Trail Ridge Middle School - Mascot:  Huskies

Elementary schools
 Edgerton Elementary - Mascot: Cyclones
 Gardner Elementary - Mascot: Panthers
 Sunflower Elementary - Mascot: Eagles
 Moonlight Elementary - Mascot: Stars
 Madison Elementary - Mascot: Bears
 Nike Elementary - Mascot: Missiles
 Grand Star Elementary - Mascot: Timberwolves

See also
 Kansas State Department of Education
 Kansas State High School Activities Association
 List of high schools in Kansas
 List of unified school districts in Kansas

References

External links
 

School districts in Kansas
Education in Johnson County, Kansas